Manod Mawr is a mountain in North Wales and forms part of the Moelwynion. Although known as a mountain in the eastern Moelwyns, it and its sister peaks are sometimes known as the Ffestiniog hills.

Manod Mawr is a mountain which has been extensively quarried. The now-closed Graig Ddu Quarry is to be found on the  contour, in the hollow between Manod Mawr's summit and Manod Mawr North Top. Manod Mawr's summit is in the exclusion zone of the Snowdonia National Park around Blaenau Ffestiniog, while Manod Mawr North Top's summit only just misses out on the national park's protection. There were fears the quarry would eventually remove the North Top.

During the Second World War, quarry tunnels in the Manod range were used to store and protect, in secret, valuable paintings from the National Gallery in London.

References

External links
 www.geograph.co.uk : photos of Manod Mawr and surrounding area

Bro Machno
Ffestiniog
Mountains and hills of Conwy County Borough
Mountains and hills of Gwynedd
Mountains and hills of Snowdonia
Marilyns of Wales
Hewitts of Wales
Nuttalls